Trigonopterus adspersus is a species of beetle found in Indonesia. It was first formally described in March 2019.

References

adspersus
Beetles described in 2019
Insects of Indonesia
Endemic fauna of Indonesia